Steve Frew (born 6 February 1973, in Falkirk) is a British artistic gymnast. He has represented Scotland and Great Britain over 100 times at various international gymnastics competitions.

He took gold in the men's rings at the 2002 Commonwealth Games in Manchester, England at the age of 28. This was the first Commonwealth Games gold medal in gymnastics for Scotland.

He competed in his fifth Commonwealth Games in Melbourne in 2006, where he qualified for the men's rings final.

His 2002 victory was significant as he had only been able to devote himself to gymnastics on a part-time basis, owing to limited funding for the sport in Scotland at that time, and had not been considered as a possible medalist. Prior to his 2002 success, Steve worked as a fitness instructor at the Livingwell Health Club in Maida-Vale, London.

Frew is a member of the Athletes Commission for Scotland, and as a member of the Glasgow 2014 bid team, he travelled to Colombo, Sri Lanka to secure the 2014 Commonwealth Games. Frew has also worked as an athlete mentor for the Sky Sports Living for Sport Programme, run by the Youth Sport Trust.

Frew has also appeared as a competitor on television in the BBC Three series Hercules, and was a member of the team representing Glasgow in the ITV game show Simply the Best.

Steve Frew opened Auchterarder Gymnastics Club in Perthshire, and as a patron he passes on his coaching skills on a regular basis.

During the London 2012 Olympic Games, he served as a gymnastics commentator at the North Greenwich Arena.

As of 2 February 2017 Steve helps out in Aberdeen for active schools, helping children improve their sports and inspiring them, He works at schools such as Dyce Academy in Aberdeen, Scotland, and many schools and organisations throughout the world.

Frew was a competitor on the 2017 ITV show 'Ninja Warrior UK' achieving a place in the final. (Top 15 competitors) finishing 11th place overall.

He married Eunice Olumide in August 2018.

References

External links
 
 

1973 births
Living people
Sportspeople from Falkirk
British male artistic gymnasts
Scottish gymnasts
Commonwealth Games medallists in gymnastics
Commonwealth Games gold medallists for Scotland
Gymnasts at the 1998 Commonwealth Games
Gymnasts at the 2002 Commonwealth Games
Gymnasts at the 2006 Commonwealth Games
Ninja Warrior UK contestants
Medallists at the 2002 Commonwealth Games